In mathematical analysis, and especially functional analysis, a fundamental role is played by the space of continuous functions on a compact Hausdorff space  with values in the real or complex numbers. It is, moreover, a normed space with norm defined by

the uniform norm.  The uniform norm defines the topology of uniform convergence of functions on   The space  is a Banach algebra with respect to this norm.

Properties 

 By Urysohn's lemma,  separates points of : If  are distinct points, then there is an  such that 
 The space  is infinite-dimensional whenever  is an infinite space (since it separates points).  Hence, in particular, it is generally not locally compact.
 If  is infinite, then  is not reflexive, nor is it weakly complete.
Then  is homeomorphic to Δ equipped with this topology. 
In particular,  is only weakly complete for  a finite set.
 The vague topology is the weak* topology on the dual of 

Generalizations 

The space  of real or complex-valued continuous functions can be defined on any topological space   In the non-compact case, however,  is not in general a Banach space with respect to the uniform norm since it may contain unbounded functions.  Hence it is more typical to consider the space, denoted here  of bounded continuous functions on   This is a Banach space (in fact a commutative Banach algebra with identity) with respect to the uniform norm. 

It is sometimes desirable, particularly in measure theory, to further refine this general definition by considering the special case when  is a locally compact Hausdorff space.  In this case, it is possible to identify a pair of distinguished subsets of : 

  the subset of  consisting of functions with compact support.  This is called the space of functions vanishing in a neighborhood of infinity.
  the subset of  consisting of functions such that for every  there is a compact set  such that  for all   This is called the space of functions vanishing at infinity.

References 

 .
 .
  
 .

Banach spaces
Complex analysis
Theory of continuous functions
Functional analysis
Real analysis
Types of functions